Sangu may refer to:

 Sangu language (Gabon)
 Sangu language (Tanzania)
 Sanghu, Taplejung, Nepal
 Sangu River, Bangladesh
 Sangu (armour), samurai armour